Polemograptis miltocosma is a species of moth of the family Tortricidae.

References

Moths described in 1910
Tortricini
Moths of Malaysia
Moths of Indonesia
Moths of the Philippines